This is a list of cemeteries in the United States. The list includes both active and historic sites, and does not include pet cemeteries. At the end of the list by states, cemeteries in territories of the United States are included. The list is for notable cemeteries and is not an attempt to list all the cemeteries in the United States.

Alabama

 List of historic cemeteries in Alabama, from the Alabama Historic Cemetery Register

Alaska

Arizona

 Boothill Graveyard, Tombstone
 Citizens Cemetery, Flagstaff (site of mass grave of victims of 1956 Grand Canyon mid-air collision)
 City of Mesa Cemetery, Mesa
 Double Butte Cemetery, Tempe
 Glendale Memorial Park Cemetery, Glendale
 Grand Canyon Pioneer Cemetery
 Greenwood/Memory Lawn Mortuary & Cemetery, Phoenix
 Hardyville Pioneer Cemetery, Bullhead City
 National Memorial Cemetery of Arizona, Phoenix
 Pioneer and Military Memorial Park, Phoenix
 Prescott National Cemetery, Prescott
 St. Francis Catholic Cemetery, Phoenix
 Twin Buttes Cemetery, Twin Buttes (ghost town)

Arkansas

California

Colorado

 Church of the Brethren, Hygiene, Colorado
 Fairmount Cemetery, Denver
 Fairmount Mausoleum, Denver
 Fairview Cemetery, Colorado Springs
 Fort Logan National Cemetery, Denver
 Fort Lyon National Cemetery, Las Animas
 Grandview Cemetery, Fort Collins
 Mount Olivet Cemetery, Wheat Ridge
 Pikes Peak National Cemetery, Colorado Springs
 Riverside Cemetery, Denver
 Silver Cliff Cemetery
 Tower of Memories, Wheat Ridge
 United States Air Force Academy Cemetery, Colorado Springs

Listed on the National Register of Historic Places in Colorado
 Evergreen Cemetery, Colorado Springs
 Riverside Cemetery, Denver
 Tower of Memories
 Ute Cemetery

Connecticut

 Abbey of Regina Laudis Cemetery, Bethlehem
 Cedar Hill Cemetery, Hartford
 Evergreen Cemetery, New Haven
 Mountain Grove Cemetery, Bridgeport

Delaware

 Immanuel Episcopal Church on the Green
 Newark Union Burial Ground

Florida

 Caballero Rivero Woodlawn Park North Cemetery and Mausoleum, Miami
 South Florida National Cemetery
 Woodlawn Cemetery (West Palm Beach, Florida)

Georgia

 Bonaventure Cemetery, Savannah
 Greenwood Cemetery, Atlanta
 Rose Hill Cemetery, Macon
 South-View Cemetery, Atlanta
 Mordecai Sheftall Cemetery, Savannah
 Levi Sheftall Family Cemetery, Savannah
Westview Cemetery, Atlanta

Hawaii

Idaho

Illinois

 All Saints Cemetery, des Plaines
 Bachelor's Grove Cemetery, Chicago
 Burr Oak Cemetery, Alsip
 Chippiannock Cemetery, Rock Island (listed on the cemetery National Registry in 1994)
 Evergreen Cemetery, Bloomington
 German Waldheim Cemetery, Forest Park, Illinois
 Graceland Cemetery, Chicago
 Holy Sepulchre Cemetery, Worth
 Homewood Memorial Gardens, Homewood
 Lake Forest Cemetery, Lake Forest
 Lincoln Cemetery, Blue Island
 Montrose Cemetery, Chicago
 Mount Carmel Cemetery, Hillside
 Oak Ridge Cemetery, Springfield
 Oak Woods Cemetery, Chicago
 Queen of Heaven Cemetery, Hillside
 Ramsey Cemetery
 Restvale Cemetery, Alsip
 Riverside Cemetery, Moline
 Rock Island National Cemetery
 Rosehill Cemetery, Chicago
 St. Adalbert Cemetery, Niles
 Westlawn Cemetery, Chicago
 Showmen's Rest (circus performers)

Indiana

 Crown Hill Cemetery, Indianapolis
 Greenlawn Cemetery, Indianapolis
 Heady Lane Cemetery, Fishers
 Lindenwood Cemetery, Fort Wayne
 Noggle Cemetery, Cass Township, Pulaski County
 Pleasant Valley Cemetery, Parke County
 Beech Grove Cemetery, Muncie

Iowa

 Linwood Cemetery, Dubuque
 Logan Park Cemetery, Sioux City
 Mount Calvary Cemetery, Davenport
 Mount Olivet Cemetery, Dubuque
 Oakdale Memorial Gardens, Davenport
 Oakland Cemetery, Fort Dodge
 Ottumwa Cemetery, Ottumwa
 Oakland Cemetery, Iowa City
 Pine Hill Cemetery, Davenport

Kansas

Kentucky

 Camp Nelson National Cemetery, Jessamine County
 Cave Hill Cemetery, Louisville
 Danville National Cemetery, Danville
 Frankfort Cemetery, Frankfort
 Lebanon National Cemetery, Lebanon
 Lexington Cemetery, Lexington
 Mill Springs National Cemetery, Nancy
 St. Louis Cemetery, Louisville
 Zachary Taylor National Cemetery, Louisville

Louisiana

 Chalmette National Cemetery, Chalmette
 Girod Street Cemetery (defunct)
 Greenwood Cemetery, New Orleans
 Holt Cemetery, New Orleans
 Locust Grove State Historic Site, St. Francisville
 Metairie Cemetery, New Orleans
 Minden Cemetery, Minden
 Port Hudson National Cemetery
 Saint Louis Cemetery, New Orleans

Maine

 Acadia National Cemetery, Jonesboro
 Calvary Cemetery, South Portland
 Coombs Cemetery, Bowdoin
 Eastern Cemetery, Portland
 Evergreen Cemetery, Portland
 Fairmount Cemetery, Presque Isle
 First Parish Cemetery, York
 Forest City Cemetery, South Portland
 Free Will Baptist Cemetery, North Islesboro
 German Cemetery, Waldoborp
 Grand Trunk Cemetery, Portland
 Gray Cemetery, Gray
 Kent Burying Ground, Fayette
 Laurel Hill Cemetery, Saco
 Mann Cemetery, Freeport
 Mount Hope Cemetery, Bangor
 Mount Pleasant Cemetery, Bangor
 Oak Grove Cemetery, Bath
 Orgonon, Rangeley
 Oxford Congregational Cemetery, Oxford
 Riverside Cemetery, Lewiston
 St. Peter's Cemetery, Lewiston
 Togus National Cemetery, Chelsea
 Webster Cemetery, Freeport
 Western Cemetery, Portland
 Wing Family Cemetery, Wayne
 Woodlawn Cemetery, Westbrook

Maryland

 Angel Hill Cemetery, Havre de Grace
 Antietam National Cemetery, Sharpsburg
 Baltimore National Cemetery, Catonsville, Maryland
 Druid Ridge Cemetery, Pikesville
 Dulaney Valley Memorial Gardens, Timonium
 Gate of Heaven Cemetery, Silver Spring
 Green Mount Cemetery, Baltimore
 Loudon Park Cemetery, Baltimore
 Mount Olivet Cemetery, Frederick
 Old Saint Paul's Cemetery, Baltimore
 Saint Mary's Cemetery, Rockville
 Spring Hill Cemetery, Easton
 United States Naval Academy Cemetery, Annapolis
 Westminster Hall and Burying Ground, Baltimore

Massachusetts

 Edson Cemetery, Lowell
 Granary Burying Ground, Boston (17th century)
 Oak Grove Cemetery, Fall River
 Pine Grove Cemetery, Lynn
 Sleepy Hollow Cemetery, Concord

Michigan

 Elmwood Cemetery, Detroit
 Forest Hill Cemetery, Ann Arbor
 Fort Custer National Cemetery, Augusta
 Glen Eden Lutheran Memorial Park, Macomb Township & Livonia
 Highland Cemetery, Ypsilanti
 Holy Sepulchre Cemetery, Southfield
 Mount Carmel Cemetery, Wyandotte
 Mount Elliott Cemetery, Detroit
 Mount Hope Cemetery, Lansing
 St. Clements Cemetery, Center Line
 St. Hedwig Cemetery, Dearborn Heights
 William Ganong Cemetery, Westland
 Woodlawn Cemetery, Detroit

Minnesota

 Acacia Park Cemetery, Mendota Heights
 Prairie Home Cemetery, Moorhead
 Steelesville Cemetery, Dassel

Listed on the National Register of Historic Places in Minnesota
 First Presbyterian Church of Oak Grove Cemetery, Bloomington
 Fort Snelling National Cemetery, Fort Snelling
 Lakewood Cemetery, Minneapolis
 Minneapolis Pioneers and Soldiers Memorial Cemetery, Minneapolis

Mississippi

Missouri

 Alexander Cemetery, Carterville
 Bellefontaine Cemetery, St. Louis
 Bollinger County Memorial Park Cemetery, Marble Hill
 Calvary Cemetery, St. Louis
Cold Water Cemetery, Florissant, St. Louis County
 Columbia Cemetery, Columbia
 Eddie Cemetery, St. Louis County
Father Dickson Cemetery, Crestwood, St. Louis County
Forest Hill Calvary Cemetery, Kansas City, Missouri
Grand View Burial Park, Hannibal
Greenwood Cemetery, Hillsdale, Missouri
 Jewell Cemetery State Historic Site, Columbia
 Mount Zion Cemetery, Boone County
 Quinette Cemetery, Kirkwood, St. Louis County
 Washington Park Cemetery, Berkeley, St. Louis County

Montana

Nebraska

 Forest Lawn Memorial Park, Omaha
 Fort McPherson National Cemetery
 St. John's Evangelical Lutheran German Church and Cemetery
 Wyuka Cemetery, Lincoln

Nevada

 Austin Cemetery
 Goodsprings Cemetery
 St. Thomas Memorial Cemetery
 Woodlawn Cemetery, Las Vegas

New Hampshire

 Ambleside Cemetery, Barrington
 Beebe Family Cemetery, Star Island, Isles of Shoals
 Blossom Hill Cemetery, Concord
 Chester Village Cemetery, Chester
 Old North Burial Ground, Portsmouth
 Old North Cemetery, Concord
 Pine Hill Cemetery, Hollis (Blood Cemetery)
 Plains Cemetery, Kingston
 Valley Cemetery, Manchester

New Jersey

 
 
 Cedar Lawn Cemetery, Paterson
 Fairview Cemetery, Westfield
 Gate of Heaven Cemetery
 Harleigh Cemetery, Camden
 Hillside Cemetery
 Mt. Pleasant Cemetery, Newark
 Princeton Cemetery, Princeton
 Riverview Cemetery, Trenton

New Mexico

 Fort Bayard National Cemetery
 Santa Fe National Cemetery

New York

 
 Baron Hirsch Cemetery, Staten Island
 Bayside Cemetery, Ozone Park, Queens
 Beth David Cemetery, Elmont, Long Island
 Calvary Cemetery (Queens), Woodside, New York
 Cypress Hills Cemetery, Brooklyn and Queens
 Ferncliff Cemetery, Hartsdale
 Forest Lawn Cemetery, Buffalo
 Gate of Heaven Cemetery, Hawthorne
 Green-Wood Cemetery, Brooklyn
 Hartsdale Pet Cemetery and Crematory, Hartsdale –  National Register of Historic Places since 2012
 Kensico Cemetery, Valhalla
 Locust Valley Cemetery, Locust Valley, New York
 Machpelah Cemetery, Glendale, Queens
 Montefiore Cemetery, Springfield Gardens, Queens
 Mount Hebron Cemetery, Flushing, Queens
 Mount Hope Cemetery, Rochester
 Mount Zion Cemetery (Elmweir), Maspeth, Queens
 New Montefiore Cemetery, West Babylon, New York
 Saint Charles Cemetery, East Farmingdale
 Salem Fields Cemetery, Cypress Hills, Brooklyn
 Sleepy Hollow Cemetery, Sleepy Hollow
 Trinity Church Cemetery, Manhattan
 Washington Cemetery, Mapleton, Brooklyn
 Westchester Hills Cemetery, Hastings-on-Hudson
 White Plains Rural Cemetery, White Plains
 Woodlawn Cemetery, The Bronx
 Woodlawn Cemetery, Elmira

North Carolina

 Beechwood Cemetery, Durham
 Cross Creek Cemetery, Fayetteville
 God's Acre, Winston-Salem (Moravian graveyard)
 Historic Oakwood Cemetery, Raleigh
 New Bern National Cemetery
 Oak Grove-Freedman's Cemetery, Salisbury
 Old Settlers' Cemetery, Charlotte
 Old Chapel Hill Cemetery, Chapel Hill
 Raleigh National Cemetery
 Salisbury National Cemetery
 Sharon Memorial Park, Charlotte
 Vance Cemetery, Weaverville
 Wilmington National Cemetery

North Dakota

Ohio

 Calvary Cemetery, Cleveland
 Erie Street Cemetery, Cleveland
 Grandview Cemetery, Chillicothe
 Green Lawn Cemetery, Columbus
 Lake View Cemetery, Cleveland
 Mound Cemetery, Marietta
 Mount Calvary Cemetery, Columbus
 Spring Grove Cemetery & Arboretum, Cincinnati
 Union Cemetery, Columbus
 West Lawn Cemetery, Canton
 Woodland Cemetery, Cleveland
 Woodland Cemetery, Dayton
 Woodlawn Cemetery, Toledo

Oklahoma

Oregon

 Eagle Point National Cemetery, Medford
 Eugene Pioneer Cemetery, Eugene
 Grand Army of the Republic Cemetery, Portland
 Gresham Pioneer Cemetery, Gresham
 Hargadine Cemetery, Ashland
 Hillsboro Pioneer Cemetery, Hillsboro
 Lee Mission Cemetery, Salem
 Lone Fir Cemetery, Portland
 Mount Calvary Cemetery, Portland
 River View Cemetery, Portland
 Roseburg National Cemetery, Roseburg
 Salem Pioneer Cemetery, Salem
 Willamette National Cemetery, Clackamas County

Pennsylvania

 
 Chester Rural Cemetery, Chester, Pennsylvania
 Christ Church Burial Ground, Philadelphia
 Eden Cemetery, Collingdale
 Greenwood Cemetery,  Pittsburgh
 Ivy Hill Cemetery, Philadelphia
 Lebanon Cemetery, Philadelphia, Pennsylvania
 Monument Cemetery, Philadelphia
 Mount Moriah Cemetery, Philadelphia and Yeadon
 Mount Peace Cemetery, Philadelphia
 Mount Vernon Cemetery, Philadelphia
 Oaklands Cemetery, West Chester
 Wildwood Cemetery (Pennsylvania), Williamsport, Pennsylvania
 The Woodlands, Philadelphia

Rhode Island

 Arnold Burying Ground, Newport
 Chestnut Hill Baptist Church and Cemetery, Exeter
 Common Burying Ground, Newport (adjacent to Island Cemetery), established in 1640
 DeWolf Cemetery, Bristol
 Island Cemetery, Newport (adjacent to Common Burying Ground)
 Little Neck Cemetery, East Providence
 Newport Memorial Park Cemetery, Middletown
 North Burial Ground, Providence, oldest cemetery in Providence
 Old Burying Ground, Little Compton
 Old Friends' Burial Ground, Jamestown
 Precious Blood Cemetery, Woonsocket
 Prince's Hill Cemetery, Barrington, Rhode Island
 Swan Point Cemetery, Providence
 Touro Cemetery, Newport – colonial era Jewish cemetery, subject of a famous poem by Henry Wadsworth Longfellow

South Carolina

 Beaufort National Cemetery, Beaufort
 Coming Street Cemetery, Charleston
 Florence National Cemetery, Florence
 Magnolia Cemetery, Charleston
 Old Quaker Cemetery, Camden
 Sandfield Cemetery, Richland County
 St. Philip's-Bradford Springs, Dalzell
 Singleton's Graveyard, Wedgefield

South Dakota

 Black Hills National Cemetery, Sturgis
 De Smet Cemetery, De Smet
 Fort Meade National Cemetery, Sturgis
 Hot Springs National Cemetery, Hot Springs
 Mount Moriah Cemetery, Deadwood
 Saint John Cemetery, Beresford

Tennessee

 
 Chattanooga National Cemetery, Chattanooga
 Elmwood Cemetery, Memphis
 Forest Hill Cemetery, Memphis
 Graceland, Memphis
 Hendersonville Memory Gardens, Hendersonville
 Memorial Park Cemetery, Memphis
 Spring Hill Cemetery, Nashville
 Woodlawn Memorial Park Cemetery, Nashville

Texas

 Der Stadt Friedhof, Fredericksburg – pioneer cemetery
 Founders Memorial Cemetery, Houston – oldest cemetery in Houston
 Jackson Ranch Church Cemetery and Eli Jackson Cemetery, Hidalgo County, Texas
 Olivewood Cemetery, Houston – the city's earliest African-American cemetery, founded around 1870
 Texas State Cemetery, Austin
 Whittaker Memorial Cemetery, Kildare, Texas

Utah

Vermont

 Green Mount Cemetery, Montpelier
 Hope Cemetery, Barre
 Laurel Glen Cemetery, Cuttingsville
 Lyndon Center Cemetery, Lyndon Center
 Notch Cemetery, Plymouth

Virginia

 African Burial Ground, Richmond, Virginia (a.k.a. Shockoe Bottom African Burial Ground)
 Alexandria National Cemetery, Alexandria
 Arlington National Cemetery, Arlington
 Barton Heights Cemeteries, Richmond, Virginia
 Belmont Plantation, Loudoun County, Family and slave cemeteries
 Blandford Cemetery, Petersburg
 Columbia Gardens Cemetery, Arlington
 Dumfries Cemetery, Dumfries
East End Cemetery, Richmond
 Evergreen Cemetery, Richmond
 Cemetery for Hebrew Confederate Soldiers, Richmond – the only Jewish military cemetery outside Israel
 Hollywood Cemetery, Richmond
 Oakwood Cemetery, Richmond, Virginia
 Richmond National Cemetery
 Mount Olivet United Methodist Church Cemetery, Arlington
 Shockoe Hill African Burying Ground, Richmond, Virginia
 Woodland Cemetery, Richmond – historically African American cemetery

Washington

 Calvary Cemetery, in the Ravenna/Bryant neighborhood of Seattle
 Comet Lodge Cemetery, Beacon Hill, Seattle – abandoned; founded 1895
 Evergreen Washelli Memorial Park, Seattle
 Grand Army of the Republic Cemetery, Seattle, adjacent to Lake View Cemetery
 Greenwood Memorial Park, Renton
 Lake View Cemetery, Seattle
 Tahoma National Cemetery, Kent

West Virginia

 Spring Hill Cemetery (Historic District)
 West Virginia National Cemetery

Wisconsin

 Calvary Cemetery, Milwaukee
 Evergreen Cemetery, Menomonie
 Forest Home Cemetery, Milwaukee
 Forest Hill Cemetery, Madison
 Historic St. Ann's, Greenwood
 La Belle Cemetery, Oconomowoc
 La Pointe Indian Cemetery, La Pointe, Wisconsin
 Mount Olivet Cemetery, Janesville
 Mount Olivet Cemetery (Milwaukee), Milwaukee
 Peshtigo Fire Cemetery, Peshtigo
 Riverside Cemetery, Oshkosh
 Riverside Cemetery, Withee
 Rutland United Brethren, Rutland
 St. Augustine, Trenton
 St. Joseph of the Lake, Menominee Indian Reservation
 Stockbridge Indian Cemetery, Stockbridge
 Wood National Cemetery, Milwaukee

Wyoming

Territories and former territories

District of Columbia

 Battleground National Cemetery
 Congressional Cemetery
 Glenwood Cemetery
 Holy Rood Cemetery
 Jesuit Community Cemetery (on the campus of Georgetown University)
 Mount Olivet Cemetery
 Oak Hill Cemetery
 Prospect Hill Cemetery
 Rock Creek Cemetery
 United States Soldiers' and Airmen's Home National Cemetery
 Washington National Cathedral
 Woodlawn Cemetery

Federated States of Micronesia

Guam
 Guam Veterans Cemetery
 Sumay Cemetery, on the National Register of Historic Places listings in Guam
 Guam Windward Memorial

Puerto Rico
 Cementerio Católico San Vicente de Paul
 Cementerio Municipal de Mayaguez
 Old Urban Cemetery
 Panteón Nacional Román Baldorioty de Castro
 Puerto Rico National Cemetery
 Santa María Magdalena de Pazzis Cemetery

Republic of Palau
 Olekull Ra Ngersuul

United States Virgin Islands

See also
 List of rural cemeteries in the United States

References